The 1982–83 Thorn EMI Rugby Union County Championship was the 83rd edition of England's County Championship rugby union club competition.

Gloucestershire won their 14th title after defeating Yorkshire in the final.

A new format was introduced which consisted of the counties being organised into four divisions with relegation and promotion.

Semi finals

Final

See also
 English rugby union system
 Rugby union in England

References

Rugby Union County Championship
County Championship (rugby union) seasons